Zweite Wiener Vereins-Sparcasse (abbreviated: Zweite Sparkasse, also: Die Zweite) is an Austrian bank based in Vienna's Leopoldstadt district (2nd municipal district). The Bank für Menschen ohne Bank as a socially oriented bank is run exclusively by volunteers from Erste Bank and the Sparkassen group and does not aim for any profits.

Business purpose and accounts management
The purpose of Die Zweite Sparkasse is to provide banking services to clients in financial problem situations. Only people referred to Zweite Sparkasse via one of the cooperating advisory organisations (see Partner organisations) are accepted as clients. On the basis of this recommendation, the new client is provided with an account, initially for a three years term, on a credit basis only and not allowing any overdrafts.

The account is debited with a so-called "account management charge" of €9 per quarter, which is refunded to the client when they change to a conventional commercial bank and the second account is closed. Clients are given an ATM card free of charge which can enables them to make worldwide cashless payments using the Maestro system, and make withdrawals from or deposits into their account via the ATMs in the foyers of Erste Bank and the Sparkasse Money transfers and the setting up of standing orders are also free of charge.

In addition to this Zweite Sparkasse also offers a "permanent account" to allow customers additional time to sort out their financial problems. In a cooperation with debt counselling services they also offer "managed accounts" from, which essential payments are made automatically. For these two accounts, the banking charges are €9 in three months, which are not refundable to the customer. Upon request, customers can open a savings account with a better interest rate and a modified model of a s- Aufbau building society savings account.

Further components of the account are the possibility of being given legal advice every three months, and if wanted a savings account at a better interest rate and a modified model of an s-Aufbau building society savings contract.

In cooperation with Wiener Städtische Versicherung, all clients of Zweite are issued with a basic insurance package when opening an account This includes free legal advice every three months, a small accident insurance policy and, for a premium of €3 per month, household insurance, which, as is customary in Austria, is combined with liability insurance for the customer and family members living in the household. Since 2008, Zweite Sparkasse has also been running workshops under the title "I €AN", to advise small groups of apprentices on financial issues and inform them about possible debt traps.

Legal organization
Legally The Zweite Sparkasse is a fully-fledged bank. As described under "#Business purpose and account management", the difference between Zweite Sparkasse and conventional banks consists not only in its social orientation but also in the fact that it is managed exclusively by around 320 volunteers from Erste Bank and the savings bank group and is not aiming for profits. The current members of the unsalaried Management Board, are Günter Benischek, Chairman of the Management Board, Gerda Holzinger-Burgstaller and Gerhard Ruprecht.

Die Zweite Wiener Vereins-Sparcasse, FN 283992k: Amendment of 8 January 2014 to the Commercial Register of the Commercial Court of Vienna.

The supporting organisation of Die Zweite Wiener Verein-Sparcasse is the association of the same name Die Zweite Wiener Verein-Sparcasse. The seven-members of the Savings Bank Council have been chosen out of the 50 members of the Association and are, headed by Franz Karl Prüller (Director of the "Social Affairs" Programme responsible for Die Zweite Sparkasse from Erste Foundation until 2013) and Reinhard Ortner, who are also members of the Association.

History

Founding
The Zweite Sparkasse was founded on the initiative of and with funds from the ERSTE Foundation. The Articles of Association dated 15 May 2006 were adopted at the founding meeting and approved by the Financial Market Authority in September of the same year. On 21 October 2006, the incorporation under company law was entered in the Commercial Register of the Commercial Court of Vienna. On 21 November 2006, the first branch in Vienna-Leopoldstadt, which is also the company's headquarters, was opened in the presence of Federal President Heinz Fischer.

Customer development
On 4 October 2006 the Zweite Sparkasse commenced operations and registered its first customers. At the end of 2007, the Zweite Sparkasse had around 1,300 customers with around 1,800 accounts in three branches and 268 volunteers' workers. At the end of 2017, the number of clients had grown to around 8,000 customers throughout Austria.

In line with the business model, around 4,000 Zweite clients have so far been successfully transferred to other banks.

Branch history
In addition to their main branch at the company's headquarters in Vienna Zweite Sparkasse operates branches in seven provincial capitals run in cooperation with volunteers from the associated savings banks of the federal provinces:

 October 2006 main branch in Vienna-Leopoldstadt (Erste Bank)
 September 2007 in Innsbruck (Tiroler Sparkasse)
 November 2007 in Salzburg (Salzburger Sparkasse)
 February 2008 in Klagenfurt (Kärntener Sparkasse)
 May 2008 in Graz (Steiermärkische Sparkasse)
 October 2009 in Villach (Kärntener Sparkasse)
 January 2011 in Linz (Allgemeine Sparkasse Oberösterreich)

In the provinces of Lower Austria and Burgenland, Die Zweite Sparkasse is represented in the so-called correspondent banking system. Individual branches of regional savings banks provide customer service for Die Zweite:

 May 2008: Sparkasse Wiener Neustadt became a correspondent bank in Lower Austria.
 November 2009: Erste Bank and Sparkasse Hainburg-Bruck-Neusiedl became correspondent banks in Burgenland.
 May 2011: Erste Bank St. Pölten also became a correspondent bank in Lower Austria.

Partner organisations
Die Zweite Sparkasse cooperates closely with partner organisations which, through their advisory and support institutions (NGOs), refer clients with difficult financial situations and the need for an account with expert advice to Die Zweite Sparkasse:

 Caritas and
 the Austrian debt counselling services.
Have been involved in the project development from the beginning and on an interregional basis.

In Vienna and some other provincial locations Zweite Sparkasse cooperates with numerous other non-governmental organisations.

Awards
 2006: 20th Greinecker Senior Citizens Award of the ORF to Evelyn Hayden for "Die Zweite Wiener Vereins-Sparcasse" (submitted by ERSTE Foundation).
 2007: Sozialmarie 2007 for "Bank für Menschen ohne Bank" (3rd prize).
 2008: Company Social Award of the Fair Finance Association (2nd place; awarded in April 2009).
 2010: TRIGOS 2010 - Nomination for the special award "Measures against poverty and social discrimination" (among the best 29 of 166 projects).
 2011: Sozialmarie 2011 for the debt prevention project "I €AN - Workshops for a Good Start in Living with Money" (4th prize - €1000 prize jointly with the Debt Counselling Service Vienna and Jugend am Werk).
 2012: Dubai International Award For Best Practices To Improve The Living Environment Award (joint prize from UN-HABITAT and Dubai City Council).
 2013: Trigos Austria 2013 in the EU category "Best Partnership: Big Companies" as part of the "1st European CSR Award".
 2017: In June 2017, the two founding directors Evelyn Hayden and Gerhard Ruprecht were awarded the Golden Medal of Honor for Services to the Republic of Austria.

Source for all:

References

External links

 Official Website Die Zweite Sparkasse
 Official Website Erste Bank
 Official Website ERSTE Stiftung

Banks of Austria
Companies based in Vienna
Non-profit organisations based in Austria
2006 establishments in Austria